The St. Paul Women's City Club is a 1931 Art Deco Streamline Moderne-style Mankato limestone clubhouse in Saint Paul, Minnesota, that was designed by architect Magnus Jemne (1882-1964). The building was designed to provide a "center for organized work and for social and intellectual intercourse", and provided a dining room, assembly rooms, dressing rooms, and bedrooms for the 1000 members  of the club and their guests. The building was sold to the Minnesota Museum of Art in 1972 and now houses an architectural firm. It is listed on the National Register of Historic Places.

References

Art Deco architecture in Minnesota
Buildings and structures completed in 1913
National Register of Historic Places in Saint Paul, Minnesota
Streamline Moderne architecture in Minnesota
Women in Minnesota
Clubhouses on the National Register of Historic Places in Minnesota
1913 establishments in Minnesota
Women's clubs in the United States